Tetratheca retrorsa is a species of plant in the quandong family that is endemic to Australia.

Description
The species grows as a spindly, sparsely-leaved, spreading shrub to 1.5 m in height. The pink flowers appear from September to October.

Distribution and habitat
The range of the species lies in the Avon Wheatbelt and Jarrah Forest IBRA bioregions of south-west Western Australia. The plants grow on lateritic breakaways.

References

retrorsa
Eudicots of Western Australia
Oxalidales of Australia
Taxa named by Joy Thompson
Plants described in 1976